Hydrogen disulfide is the inorganic compound with the formula H2S2. This hydrogen chalcogenide is a pale yellow volatile liquid with a camphor-like odor. It decomposes readily to hydrogen sulfide (H2S) and elemental sulfur.

Structure
The structure of hydrogen disulfide is similar to that of hydrogen peroxide, with C2 point group symmetry. Both molecules are distinctly nonplanar. The dihedral angle is 90.6°, compared with 111.5° in H2O2. The H−S−S bond angle is 92°, close to 90° for unhybridized divalent sulfur.

Synthesis and reactions
Hydrogen disulfide can be synthesised by dissolving alkali metal or alkaline earth metal polysulfides in water. When the solution is mixed with concentrated hydrochloric acid at −15 °C, a yellow oil consisting a mixture of polysulfanes (H2Sn) will pool below the aqueous layer. Fractional distillation of this oil gives hydrogen disulfide separate from any other polysulfides (mostly trisulfide).

Hydrogen disulfide readily decomposes under ambient conditions to hydrogen sulfide and sulfur. In organosulfur chemistry, hydrogen disulfide adds to alkenes to give disulfides and thiols.

Quantum tunneling and its suppression in deuterium disulfide
The deuterated form of hydrogen disulfide DSSD, has a similar geometry to HSSH, but its tunneling time is slower, making it a convenient test case for the quantum Zeno effect, in which frequent observation of a quantum system suppresses its normal evolution. Trost and Hornberger have calculated that while an isolated DSSD molecule would spontaneously oscillate between left and right chiral forms with a period of 5.6 milliseconds, the presence of a small amount of inert helium gas should stabilize the chiral states, the collisions of the helium atoms in effect "observing" the molecule's momentary chirality and so suppressing spontaneous evolution to the other chiral state.

Health effects
If it is present in high concentrations, it can cause dizziness, disorientation and ultimately unconsciousness.

References

Hydrogen compounds
Disulfides